JS Taigei (SS-513) is the first boat of the  attack submarine of Japan Maritime Self-Defense Force. The submarine was ordered from Mitsubishi Heavy Industries in 2017 and laid down on 16 March 2018 at Kobe, Japan. Taigei was launched on 14 October 2020 and commissioned on 9 March 2022.

Development and design 
The hull design of the Taigei class is said to not differ too much from the operational  but will be 100 tons heavier than its predecessor. However, the Taigei-class submarines will be more advanced as they are equipped with newer equipment such as sonar systems, snorkel power generation system. The Taigei class will use lithium-ion batteries much like JS Ōryū and JS Tōryū of the Sōryū-class submarines. The submarine will likely use the Type 18 torpedo, which project name as "G-RX6". In addition, in response to the lifting of restrictions on the placement of female SDF personnel on submarines, the work of female SDF personnel is being supported by establishing partitions in the living quarters and securing bedrooms for women.

Construction and career 
Taigei was laid down at Mitsubishi Heavy Industries Kobe Shipyard on 16 March 2018 as the 2017 plan 3000-ton submarine No. 8128 based on the medium-term defense capability development plan (26 medium-term defense), and in 2020. It was named Taigei at the naming and launching ceremony held at the factory on 14 October. 
It was handed over to the Maritime Self-Defense Force on March 9, 2022 and deployed to the Yokosuka Naval Base. Construction cost estimated at 720 million USD.

Gallery

Citations

Ships built by Mitsubishi Heavy Industries
2020 ships
Taigei-class submarines